The 2011 Open GDF Suez de Bretagne was a professional tennis tournament played on clay courts. It was the twelfth edition of the tournament which was part of the 2011 ITF Women's Circuit. It took place in Saint-Malo, France between 19 and 25 September 2011.

WTA entrants

Seeds

 1 Rankings are as of September 12, 2011.

Other entrants
The following players received wildcards into the singles main draw:
  Séverine Beltrame
  Audrey Bergot
  Alizé Lim
  Nathalie Piquion

The following players received entry from the qualifying draw:
  Mariana Duque
  Bibiane Schoofs
  Scarlett Werner
  Nina Zander

The following players received entry by a lucky loser spot:
  Catalina Castaño 
  Eva Fernández-Brugués

Champions

Singles

 Sorana Cîrstea def.  Sílvia Soler Espinosa, 6–2, 6–2

Doubles

 Nina Bratchikova /  Darija Jurak def.  Johanna Larsson /  Jasmin Wöhr, 6–4, 6–2

External links
Official Website
ITF Search 

Open GDF Suez de Bretagne
L'Open 35 de Saint-Malo
Open